Lena Ivancok (born 29 March 2001) is an Austrian handballer for RK Podravka Koprivnica and the Austrian national team.

She represented Austria at the 2021 World Women's Handball Championship, placing 16th.

References

2001 births
Living people
Austrian female handball players
Handball players from Vienna
21st-century Austrian women
Austrian people of Croatian descent